Neil, Neal, or Neill Collins may refer to:
 Neil Collins (speedway rider) (born 1961), English former speedway rider
 Neil Collins (broadcaster)  (1941–2018), New Zealand broadcaster and local body politician
 Neil Collins (Gaelic footballer), player for Roscommon GAA
 Neill Collins (born 1983), Scottish footballer
 Neal Collins (politician) (born 1982), member of the South Carolina House of Representatives